was a Japanese fashion magazine published by Shogakukan. The name derives from  meaning "older sister" and Can from its sister magazine CanCam. The magazine targeted women in their mid-late twenties, previous readers of CanCam.

History and profile
AneCan was first launched in March 2007 as the magazine for women who have graduated from reading CanCam. "Ane" means "older sister" and "Can" comes from CanCam.

For the magazines launch the department store Isetan and several clothing companies collaborated with AneCan to create completely new brands. On 14 March 2007, Senken Shimbun reported that the "AneCan Style" brands sold 30,000,000 JPY (~US$250,000) in just four days.

On 10 August 2016, it was revealed that the magazine would be suspended after the December 2016 issue.

Exclusive contract models 
All of these models are under exclusive contract with AneCan, limiting their professional appearances to the magazine.
 Current 
Erika Mori
Midori Kuzuoka
Moe Oshikiri
Miki Arimura
Shizuka Kondo
Mew Azama
Sayaka Isoyama
Mitsuki Oishi
Risako Ishikawa
 Past 
alan
Asami Usuda
Eriko Kumazawa
Keiko Mayama
Maimi Okuwa
Hitomi Sawano
Raima Sharma
Yoko Horiuchi
Sachi Suzuki
Reiko Takagaki
Yuri Ebihara
Sayaka Isoyama

References

External links
 Official website

2007 establishments in Japan
2016 establishments in Japan
Defunct women's magazines published in Japan
Fashion magazines published in Japan
Magazines established in 2007
Magazines disestablished in 2016
Magazines published in Tokyo
Monthly magazines published in Japan
Shogakukan magazines
Women's fashion magazines